is a 1999 Japanese supernatural horror film, directed by Hideo Nakata and serves as a sequel to Ring.

Ring was originally a novel written by Koji Suzuki; its sequel, Rasen (a.k.a. Spiral), was also adapted into a film as the sequel to Ring. Due to the poor response to Rasen, Ring 2 was made as a new sequel to Ring. However it was not based on Suzuki's works, thus it ultimately ignores the story of Rasen.

Ring 2 takes place a couple of weeks after the first film, directly continuing the story and features most of the cast from Ring reprising their roles.

Plot
After the body of Sadako Yamamura is retrieved from a well, her uncle Takashi is summoned by police to identify her. Detective Omuta explains to Takashi that forensics concluded Sadako may have survived in the well for thirty years. Forensics experts reconstruct her body, giving it to Takashi, who gives his niece a burial at sea, hoping to be free from the guilt he has carried since her mother Shizuko committed suicide because of his actions. The police search for Reiko Asakawa and her son Yoichi following the sudden death of her ex-husband Ryuji Takayama and her father Koichi a week later. Mai Takano, Ryuji's university assistant, investigates his death, visiting Reiko's news office where her colleague Okazaki joins Mai in her search for answers. They find a burnt out videotape in Reiko's apartment, Mai sensing Reiko's father died the same way as Ryuji.

Investigating the urban legend of the cursed videotape, Okazaki meets a high school student Kanae Sawaguchi, who gives him a copy of the tape but admits she watched it herself. She begs Okazaki to watch the tape before the week is up, but he chickens out and hides his copy in his desk drawer at work.

Mai and Okazaki go to a mental hospital to speak to Masami Kurahashi, a friend of Reiko's niece Tomoko, but learn she is both mute and has a phobia of televisions, having witnessed Tomoko's death. They meet Doctor Oisho Kawajiri, Masami's doctor, and a paranormal researcher, who is trying to expel the psychic energy within Masami through experimentation. Mai steps out for some air, encountering Masami, whose presence causes Sadako to materialise on a television and terrify the patients. Masami tries to channel her fear into psychic vessel Mai, who realizes Yoichi has been trying to do the same thing.

Mai finds Yoichi alone in a shopping mall before his mother appears. Mai learns Yoichi has been mute since his father and grandfather's deaths and his psychic abilities intensified, and Reiko asks if Kawajiri can help. Returning to the hospital, Mai discovers that Okazaki has accidentally led the police to Kawajiri, who has informed them of Mai's contact with Reiko. Mai, Okazaki, and Detective Omuta observe Kawajiri's experiment to exorcise the psychic energy from Masami by projecting her mental imagery onto a blank tape. However, it causes the cursed videotape's imagery to appear. Mai destroys the recording. Omuta tortures Mai into revealing Reiko and Yoichi's location, forcing Mai to view Kanae's fear contorted corpse. Overcome with guilt, Mai telepathically tells Yoichi to flee the police station. Yoichi psychically attacks the cops and escapes with Reiko, who is consequentially hit and crushed underneath a truck. Yoichi begins to psychically kill Omuta, but is stopped by Mai as the two run off together. Okazaki attempts to delete his interview with Kanae, only for her ghost to materialise and haunt him.

Mai and Yoichi travel to Oshima Island and stay in the Yamamura Inn. Yoichi has a nightmare, causing Shizuko's and a young Sadako's ghosts to appear before Mai wards them away. Dr. Kawajiri arrives in the night, offering to exorcise Yoichi as he tried with Masami, with Mai volunteering to act as a conduit to expel Sadako's hatred into a swimming pool, water being able to neutralise the energy. The attempt turns frightening and Sadako's coffin appears in the pool. Takashi jumps in demanding to be taken by Sadako, while Kawajiri dives into the pool carrying electrical equipment, killing themselves alongside their assistant.

Mai and Yoichi fall into the water, appearing inside the well. Ryuji's ghost appears, absorbing Yoichi's fear, and summons a rope that will guide Mai to safety as long as she doesn't look down. Sadako's ghost appears, scaling the well only to cryptically ask, "Why is it only you were saved?". Mai and Yoichi emerge in the pool, tentatively free of their fear. While Okazaki is institutionalised, a nurse takes a picture of him. As she leaves the room she notices something in the photo, seemingly shocked; behind Okazaki is Kanae's laughing spirit looking for revenge.

Cast 
 Miki Nakatani as Mai Takano
 Rikiya Otaka as Yoichi Asakawa
 Nanako Matsushima as Reiko Asakawa
 Yoichi Numata as Takashi Yamamura
 Rie Inō as Sadako Yamamura
 Mebuki Tsuchida as young Sadako Yamamura
 Kyoko Fukada as Kanae Sawaguchi
 Yūrei Yanagi as Okazaki
 Hitomi Satō as Masami Kurahashi
 Hiroyuki Sanada as Ryuji Takayama
 Fumiyo Kohinata as Ishi Kawajiri
 Kenjirō Ishimaru as Detective Keiji Omuta
 Masako as Shizuko Yamamura

Release
Ring 2 was released in Japan on January 23, 1999 where it was distributed by Toho. It was released on a double bill with the film Shikoku. In the Philippines, the film was released as Ring 2: Call of Evil on March 5, 2003. The film was released directly to video in the United States on August 23, 2005 by DreamWorks.

Box office
It was the second highest-grossing Japanese film of 1999 (after Pokémon: The Movie 2000), earning a distribution income (rentals) of  upon its theatrical release.

In South Korea, the film sold 128,521 tickets. In France, the film sold 22,263 tickets, bringing the film's total overseas box office to 150,784 ticket sales.

Home media
In the United Kingdom, it was watched by 360,000 viewers on television during the first half of 2005, making it the seventh most-watched foreign-language film on UK television during that period. The original Ring also drew 390,000 viewers on UK television during the same period, adding up to a combined 750,000 UK television viewership for both Ring films during the first half of 2005.

Reception

Variety referred to the film as a "very different beast" than the Ring, with "less atmosphere and more genre shocks". The review stated that the film "notably fails to build on the first movie's wonderfully nasty final scene" and is "progressively more conventional with no special visual style or under-the-skins frissons".

As a result of the film's popularity, one of the film's cast members, Kyoko Fukada (role of Kanae Sawaguchi), was offered a recording contract with Pony Canyon (the label that handled the releases of the film's soundtrack and its accompanying single), and her debut single  was released by Pony Canyon on May 19, 1999.

Ring 2 holds a 0% rating on Rotten Tomatoes based on thirteen reviews.

See also
 List of ghost films

References

Bibliography

External links
 
 
 

1999 films
1990s Japanese-language films
1999 horror films
Fiction about photography
Films about curses
Films about psychic powers
Films directed by Hideo Nakata
Films scored by Kenji Kawai
Japanese ghost films
Japanese horror films
Japanese sequel films
Alternative sequel films
Japanese supernatural horror films
The Ring (franchise)
Toho films
1990s Japanese films